Santirbazar is a town and Municipal Council in South Tripura district, Tripura, India. It is linked with Agartala (the state capital) by National Highway 8 via Udaipur and Bishramganj to Sabroom.

Geography

It has an average elevation of 30 metres (98 feet).

Demographics
 India census, Santirbazar Municipal Council has a population of 15,647. Males constitute 52% of the population and females 48%. Santirbazar has an average literacy rate of 95%, higher than the national average of 59.5%; with 54% of the males and 46% of females literate. 9% of the population is under 6 years of age.

Education
Schools:
 Santir bazar H/S School
 Santir bazar Girls H/S School
 Bokafa Ashram H/S School
 Kendriya Vidyalaya, Bagafa
 Sunflower English Medium Academy 
 Betaga H/S School
 West Bokafa H/S School 
Colleges:
 Government Degree College, Santirbazar

Places of interest 
 Trishna Wildlife Sanctuary
 Jogmaya Temple, Kalibari
 Indo-Bangla Custom Checkpost
 Raj Rajeswari Temple, Muhuripur
 Muhurichar river island
 Muhuripur Fishery near Bamchara
 Mahamuni Temple, Mohamuni Road
 Buddhist Temple (Kalashi)

Santir Bazar railway station 
A railway station was constructed in Santirbazar (code: SNTBR) which serves the town. The station lies on the Agartala - Sabroom rail section, which comes under the Lumding railway division of the Northeast Frontier Railway. The segment from Agartala to Sabroom via Udaipur became operational on 3 October 2019, with a proposed elevation of 39m.

Santirbazar integrated checkpost 
Santir bazar integrated check post on the India-Bangladesh border on Santir bazar-Feni rail and road route is in Mizoram in India. It was officially opened in October 2017 by Prime Minister Narendra Modi.

Politics
Belonia assembly constituency is in the Tripura West Lok Sabha constituency.

See also
 List of cities and towns in Tripura
 Amarpur
 Teliamura
 Khumulwng
 Kailashahar
 Chittamara, Belonia

References

Cities and towns in South Tripura district
South Tripura district

8.https://schools.org.in/south-tripura./16020701806/betaga-hs-school.html----Betaga H/S School,Lowgang,Santir Bazar,South Tripura

 
9.https://www.indiainfo.net/amp_place. /west-bokafa-hs-school-5063259--- West Bokafa H/S School,Bokafa ,Santir Bazar, South Tripura.